Astyris lunata is a species of sea snail, a marine gastropod mollusc in the family Columbellidae, the dove snails.

Description

Distribution
This marine species occurs off Canada: Nova Scotia, New Brunswick; USA: Maine; also offFrench Guiana

References

 Brunel, P.; Bosse, L.; Lamarche, G. (1998). Catalogue of the marine invertebrates of the estuary and Gulf of St. Lawrence. Canadian Special Publication of Fisheries and Aquatic Sciences, 126. 405 p
 Pelorce J. (2017). Les Columbellidae (Gastropoda: Neogastropoda) de la Guyane française. Xenophora Taxonomy. 14: 4–21

External links
 Orbigny A. d'. (1841–1853). Mollusques. In: R. de la Sagra (ed.). Histoire physique, politique et naturelle de l'Ile de Cuba. Arthus Bertrand, Paris. Vol 1: 1–264 [pp. 1–240, pls 1–10?, 1841; 241–264, 1842; Vol. 2: 1–380 [pp. 1–112, pls 10–21?, 1842; 113–128, 1844; 129–224, pls 22–25?, 1847; 225–380, pls 26–28]
 Rosenberg, G.; Moretzsohn, F.; García, E. F. (2009). Gastropoda (Mollusca) of the Gulf of Mexico, Pp. 579–699 in: Felder, D.L. and D.K. Camp (eds.), Gulf of Mexico–Origins, Waters, and Biota. Texas A&M Press, College Station, Texas
 Trott, T. J. (2004). Cobscook Bay inventory: a historical checklist of marine invertebrates spanning 162 years. Northeastern Naturalist. 11, 261–324

Columbellidae
Gastropods described in 1826